The following weekly polls comprise the 2012 NCAA Division I FCS football rankings which determine the top 25 teams at the NCAA Division I Football Championship Subdivision level of college football for the 2012 season.  The Sports Network poll is voted by media members while the Coaches' Poll is determined by coaches at the FCS level.

Legend

The Sports Network Poll

Coaches' Poll

References

Rankings
NCAA Division I FCS football rankings